The Big Hill Formation is a geologic formation in Michigan. It preserves fossils dating back to the Ordovician period. A fossiliferous site on the Stonington Peninsula (in Delta County) includes a dolostone layer of the Big Hill Formation which has abundant and well-preserved fossils. The most common fossils are soft-bodied medusae (jellyfish), followed by linguloid brachiopods, algae, and arthropods (namely chasmataspidids, leperditid ostracods, and eurypterids). This site is considered a Konservat-Lagerstätte, and is commonly referred to as the Big Hill Lagerstätte or Big Hill Biota.

See also

 List of fossiliferous stratigraphic units in Michigan

References

 

Ordovician System of North America
Ordovician Michigan
Upper Ordovician Series